Epermenia vartianae is a moth of the family Epermeniidae. It is found in south-eastern Afghanistan and Tajikistan.

References

Moths described in 1971
Epermeniidae
Moths of Asia
Insects of Central Asia
Insects of Afghanistan